Thomas M Chambers was a Canadian international lawn bowls player who competed in the 1930 British Empire Games for Scotland.

Bowls career
At the 1930 British Empire Games he won the bronze medal in the rinks (fours) event with David Fraser, John Orr and William Campbell.

Bizarrely, he won the medal for Scotland despite being Canadian because John Kennedy, a member of the Scottish rinks team, had died in the United States en route to Canada. The other teams agreed that Chambers could be a substitute even though he was not Scottish.

References

Canadian male bowls players
Scottish male bowls players
Bowls players at the 1930 British Empire Games
Commonwealth Games bronze medallists for Scotland
Commonwealth Games medallists in lawn bowls
Medallists at the 1930 British Empire Games